In music, Op. 70 stands for Opus number 70. Compositions that are assigned this number include:

 Beethoven – Piano Trios, Op. 70
 Britten – Nocturnal after John Dowland
 Chopin – Waltzes, Op. 70
 Dvořák – Symphony No. 7
 Godard – Les Guelfes
 Mendelssohn – Elijah
 Prokofiev – The Queen of Spades
 Rubinstein – Piano Concerto No. 4
 Schumann – Adagio and Allegro for Horn and Piano
 Scriabin – Piano Sonata No. 10
 Shostakovich – Symphony No. 9
 Sibelius – Luonnotar
 Stanford – Violin Sonata No. 2
 Strauss – Schlagobers
 Tchaikovsky – Souvenir de Florence